Agricultural Stabilization and Conservation Service (in the Department of Agriculture) (ASCS)
Replaced in 1994 with the Farm Service Agency.
 Agricultural Adjustment Administration (AAA)
 Board of Economic Warfare (BEW)
 Board of Tea Appeals
Abolished in 1996
 Bureau of Arms Control (in the Department of State)
Replaced September 13, 2005, by the Bureau of International Security and Nonproliferation
 Bureau of Nonproliferation (in the Department of State)
Replaced September 13, 2005, by the Bureau of International Security and Nonproliferation
 Bureau of Verification and Compliance (in the Department of State)
Replaced February 1, 2000 by the Bureau of Verification, Compliance, and Implementation
 Civil Aeronautics Board was an agency of the federal government of the United States, formed in 1938 and abolished in 1985.
 Committee on Public Information (CPI)
Department of War existed from August 7, 1789 until September 18, 1947 and renamed the United States Department of Defense in 1949.
 Farmers Home Administration
Replaced in 1994 with the Farm Service Agency.
 Farm Security Administration (FSA)
 Federal National Mortgage Association (FNMA or Fannie Mae)
Fannie Mae was partially privatized in 1968; its government administered portion was renamed the Government National Mortgage Association (Ginnie Mae); see Department of Housing and Urban Development, above
 Health Care Financing Administration (HCFA)
Renamed Centers for Medicare and Medicaid Services; see Department of Health and Human Services, above
 Student Loan Marketing Association (SLMA or Sallie Mae)
Sallie Mae has been fully privatized and is no longer administered by the federal government.
 Foreign Economic Administration (FEA)
 Federal Theatre Project  (FTP)
 General Accounting Office (GAO)
Renamed "Government Accountability Office" in 2004; see #Legislative Branch, above.
 Interstate Commerce Commission (ICC)
 Immigration and Naturalization Service (INS)
Now the United States Citizenship and Immigration Service (USCIS)
 National Advisory Committee for Aeronautics  (NACA)
 U.S. Coast and Geodetic Survey
Renamed U.S. National Geodetic Survey
 Office of the Coordinator of Inter-American Affairs (OCIAA)
 Office of Technology Assessment (OTA)
Congress closed the OTA in 2004.
 Office of War Information (OWI)
 Reconstruction Finance Corporation (RFC)
 Resettlement Administration (RA)
Turned into Farm Security Administration in 1937.
 United States Information Agency (USIA)
 United States Life-Saving Service
Merged with the Revenue Cutter Service to create the United States Coast Guard
 Veterans Administration (VA)
Became a cabinet department in 1988; see United States Department of Veterans Affairs, above.
 War Production Board (WPB)
 Works Progress Administration (WPA)

See also
List of United States federal agencies

External links
U.S. Government Manual, official online version of the United States Government Manual, continually updated.
U.S. Government Manual, official freely downloadable PDFs of  annual printed versions, 1995–present. Edition printed November 2013 includes appendix, "History of Agency Organizational Changes" (pp. 547–608) and "Commonly Used Agency Acronyms"(pp. 539–545).
CyberCemetery, online document archive of defunct U.S. Federal Agencies, maintained by the University of North Texas Libraries in partnership with the Federal Depository Library Program of the GPO

Defunct agencies of the United States government
Lists of defunct organizations
-